St. Mary A.M.E. Church is a historic church for African Americans in Thomaston, Georgia, first congregated in 1867. The original church building was constructed in 1870 and William Harris brought in as the pastor, the third pastor serving the congregation. The church provided the community with its first school for African American students. In 1905, the current church building was constructed.

References

External link
 

African Methodist Episcopal churches in Georgia (U.S. state)
Churches completed in 1870
1870 establishments in Georgia (U.S. state)
Religious organizations established in 1870
Buildings and structures in Upson County, Georgia